The 2002 World Junior Curling Championships were held at the Kelowna Curling Club in Kelowna, British Columbia, Canada March 23–31.

Men's

Playoffs

Women's

Playoffs

Sources

J
World Junior Curling Championships
Curling in British Columbia
Sport in Kelowna
2002 in British Columbia
International curling competitions hosted by Canada
2002 in youth sport
March 2002 sports events in Canada
Sports competitions in British Columbia